The 2022–23 West Coast Conference men's basketball season began with practices in September 2022 and will end with the 2023 West Coast Conference men's basketball tournament in March 2023. This will be the 72nd season for WCC men's basketball, and the 34th under its current name of "West Coast Conference". The conference was founded in 1952 as the California Basketball Association, became the West Coast Athletic Conference in 1956, and dropped the word "Athletic" in 1989.

Head coaches

Coaching changes 
Two new head coaches will lead their team in the WCC during the 2022-23 season. On March 6, the University of San Diego announced that they had released Sam Scholl as head coach. Then, on April 6, USD announced that Steve Lavin, who previously had coached at both UCLA and St. John's, had been hired as the new head coach. Due to Todd Golden accepting the position as basketball coach at the University of Florida, San Francisco also had a coaching change. The long time assistant coach Chris Gerlufsen was hired as head coach at USF on March 18.

Coaches 

Notes:

 Year at school includes 2022–23 season.
 Overall and WCC records are from time at current school and are through the beginning of the 2022–23 season.

Preseason

Conference realignment 
On September 10, 2021, BYU was one of four schools (the others being Cincinnati, Houston, and UCF) that accepted invitations to join the Big 12 Conference beginning with the 2023-24 athletic season. Therefore, BYU will remain a member of the WCC for the current season, with the WCC potentially dropping to 9 teams for the 2023-24 season. West Coast Conference commissioner Gloria Nevarez indicated that the conference is open to adding additional schools to the conference to ensure "continued success" for the league.

Preseason poll

All-WCC Preseason Men's Basketball team

Rankings

Regular season

Conference matrix

Early season tournaments 
The following table summarizes the multiple-team events (MTE) or early season tournaments in which teams from the West Coast Conference will participate.

WCC Player/Freshman of the Week 
Throughout the year, the West Coast Conference names a player of the week and a freshman of the week as follows:

All-WCC Awards and Teams 
On March 2, 2022, the West Coast Conference announced the following awards:

References 

2022–23 West Coast Conference men's basketball season